Kudumbam is a 1954 Indian Tamil-language film directed by Jampana. The film stars Sri Ram and G. Varalakshmi.

Plot
Dharmalingam is a clerk in a pawn shop. His wife is Seetha. They have a son, Rajendran. Dharmalingam finds it difficult to meet ends with his meagre salary. Seetha's father Veeraiah visits them and realises the family's financial problems. He tells daughter Seetha that he wants Rajendran, when he grows up, to marry his grand-daughter Sarada. ie: his son Ramanna's daughter. Veeraiah takes Rajendran with him. 
Ramesh is the son of a Zamindar. One day he cleverly steals a diamond necklace from the pawn shop. Dharmalingam is charged with the theft and sent to jail. Seetha takes refuge with her brother Ramanna. Though Ramanna and father Veeraiah are sympathetic towards her, Ramanna's wife Kamatchi ill-treats her. Seetha goes away with son Rajendran and lives a simple life in a hut. Rajendran grows up and joins a college. Sarada also now grown up and joins the same college. They meet and fall in love with each other. Ramesh returns from abroad after studies. Dharmalingam is released from jail and he goes to work as a domestic aid in Ramesh's house. He waits for a chance to take revenge. Kamatchi is trying to marry daughter Sarada to Ramesh as he is a rich man. Ramesh learns about the love affair between Rajendran and Sarada and gets furious. How things are sorted out forms the rest of the story.

Cast
List adapted from the song book.

Male Cast
 Sri Ram  Rajendran
 K. A. Thangavelu  Veeraiah
 T. S. Durairaj  Ramanna
 C. H. Narayana Rao  Dharmalingam
 T. K. Ramachandran  Ramesh
 T. V. Radhakrishnan  Singaram
 C. D. Kannabhiran  Sekar

Female cast
 G. Varalakshmi  Seetha
 K. Savithri  Sarada
 M. R. Santhanalakshmi  Lakshmi
 T. P. Muthulakshmi  Meena
 C. K. Saraswathi  Kamatchi

Production
The film was produced by Jambana Nandhi Productions and was directed by Jampana. M. S. Subramaniam and A. L. Narayanan wrote the story and dialogues. The film was produced in Telugu also with the title Menarikam.

Soundtrack
Music was composed by Pendyala Nageswara Rao and the lyrics were penned by M. S. Subramaniam. Playback singers are M. L. Vasanthakumari, P. A. Periyanayaki, P. Leela, Jikki, Ssheela, Ghantasala, Rajah, T. M. Soundararajan, M. S. Rama Rao and Nageswara Rao.

References

External links
Songs from the film
 
 

1954 films